Aldis Kļaviņš (30 April 1975 – 1 August 2000) was a Latvian slalom canoer who competed from the early 1990s to the early 2000s. He finished 21st in the K-1 event at the 1996 Summer Olympics in Atlanta.

References

External links
 
 

1975 births
2000 deaths
People from Valmiera
Canoeists at the 1996 Summer Olympics
Latvian male canoeists
Olympic canoeists of Latvia